Avramescu is a Romanian surname. Notable people with the surname include:

 Alexandru Avramescu (born 1991), Romanian footballer
 Gheorghe Avramescu (1888–1945), Romanian Lieutenant-General during World War II

See also 
 Avrămeşti (disambiguation)

Romanian-language surnames
Patronymic surnames
Surnames from given names